Éloa, ou La sœur des anges (Éloa, or the Sister of the Angels), published in 1824 (see 1824 in poetry), is Alfred de Vigny's tripartite philosophic epic  poem of Eloa, an innocent angel who falls in love with a stranger at odds with God.  It is made clear that the stranger is Lucifer.  He falls in love with the girl, but his own twisted notions of love prohibit him from returning the girl's affection in a proper way.  In the end, the girl is unable to help Lucifer and he drags her to hell with him.  Even as she is falling, she does not know who he is until he tells her his name. A translation into English by Alan D. Corré is available on Kindle; it includes the French text.

Further reading
 Gruber, Lucretia S. (1976). "Alfred de Vigny's 'Eloa': A Modern Myth," Modern Language Studies, Vol. VI, No. 1, pp. 74–82.

External links
 Éloa by Alfred de Vigny

1824 books
1824 poems
Books about angels
Epic poems in French
French poems
Fiction about the Devil
Romantic fiction
Lucifer